Massy is a former commune in the Saône-et-Loire department in the region of Bourgogne-Franche-Comté in eastern France. On 1 January 2017, it was merged into the new commune La Vineuse sur Fregande.

Sights
Church Saint-Denis, dating from the eleventh century, listed as a historic monument since 1991.
Ruins from Roman times, including a small bridge crossing the river.
An old fortified middle-age castle build on the base of Roman constructions. It used to be a subsidiary of the Cluny Monastery

See also
Communes of the Saône-et-Loire department

References

Former communes of Saône-et-Loire